Historic Wolcott House is a historic home located at Wolcott, White County, Indiana. It was built about 1859 by Anson Wolcott the founder of the town of Wolcott. It is a two-story,  Italianate style wood-frame building with a rectangular wing.  It sits on a rubblestone foundation and has a [wood shake] hipped roof.  It was home to three generations of the politically prominent Wolcott family. The Anson Wolcott Historical Society is the caretaker of this beautiful historic home.

It was listed on the National Register of Historic Places in 1975.

References

Former National Register of Historic Places in Indiana
Houses on the National Register of Historic Places in Indiana
Italianate architecture in Indiana
Houses completed in 1859
Buildings and structures in White County, Indiana
National Register of Historic Places in White County, Indiana